The International Association for the Study of the Commons (IASC) was founded in 1989 as The International Association for the Study of Common Property (IASCP). It is a non-for-profit organization that sees as its mission to further the understanding of institutions for the management of resources that are or could be held or used collectively as a commons by communities in developing and industrialized countries.

According to its vision statement, the goals of the association are:
 to encourage exchange of knowledge on the commons among diverse disciplines, areas, and resource types
 to foster mutual exchange of scholarship and practical experience
 to promote appropriate institutional design

International Journal of the Commons 

IASC publishes the International Journal of the Commons, "an interdisciplinary peer-reviewed open-access journal ... dedicated to furthering the understanding of institutions for use and management of resources that are (or could be) enjoyed collectively." The journal's editors-in-chief are Frank van Laerhoven (Utrecht University) and Michael Schoon (Arizona State University).

Conferences 

The association organizes biennial global conferences as well as regional conferences. In 2012, it also organized the first First Thematic Conference on the Knowledge Commons.

See also 

Common land
 Tragedy of the commons
 Information Commons
 Knowledge commons
 Commons-based peer production

References

External links
 International Association for the Study of the Commons official website
 International Journal of the Commons
 First Thematic Conference of IASC on the Knowledge Commons

Public commons
International professional associations
Organizations established in 1989
Ecological economics